The discography of American singer-songwriter Mary Chapin Carpenter consists of 16 studio albums, four compilation albums, three video albums, 41 singles, 15 music videos, and 88 album appearances. After recording a demo tape, she was signed to Columbia Records in 1987 and released her debut studio album Hometown Girl (1987). In June 1989, Carpenter's second studio album State of the Heart was issued, which transitioned more towards country music. Among its four singles, both "Never Had It So Good" and "Quittin' Time" became top 10 hits on the Billboard Hot Country Singles and Tracks chart. Shooting Straight in the Dark was released in October 1990 and certified platinum in sales by the Recording Industry Association of America. Its third single "Down at the Twist and Shout" won the Grammy Award for Best Female Country Vocal Performance in 1992 and became a top ten hit. In June 1992, Carpenter released Come On Come On, which became her best-selling record. From seven singles issued, the songs "I Feel Lucky", "Passionate Kisses", and "He Thinks He'll Keep Her" became top ten hits on the Billboard country chart. Her fifth album Stones in the Road (1994) debuted at number one on the Top Country Albums chart and number 10 on the Billboard 200. Its lead single "Shut Up and Kiss Me" topped the Billboard country chart in 1994. Her sixth studio release entitled A Place in the World (1996) certified gold in sales in the United States. Party Doll and Other Favorites (1998) was Carpenter's first compilation album, also certifying gold in sales from the RIAA.

Carpenter entered the 2000s with her seventh studio album Time* Sex* Love* (2001), debuting at number six on the Billboard Top Country Albums chart. The release was nominated by the Grammy Awards in 2002 for Best-Engineered Album. Three years later, Between Here and Gone (2004) was issued. The record was co-produced by Carpenter and pianist Matt Rollings. She returned in 2007 with her 10th studio album The Calling on Zoë Records. The project debuted at number 10 on the Billboard Top Country Albums chart and sold 100,000 copies within its first few weeks. After recording a holiday album, Come Darkness, Come Light: Twelve Songs of Christmas in 2008, Carpenter entered the next decade with The Age of Miracles in April 2010. Among other entries, The Age or Miracles debuted within the top 10 of the Billboard Top Rock Albums chart. She followed with her 13th studio album Ashes and Roses (2012). Carpenter then collaborated with arranger Vince Mendoza to issue Songs from the Movie (2014), an album of orchestral music. In May 2016, The Things That We Are Made Of marked a return to traditional roots music and debuted a number eight on the Top Country Albums chart. Carpenter's fifteenth studio album Sometimes Just the Sky (2018) contained new versions of previously-recorded material and debuted at number thirteen on the Billboard folk albums chart.

Albums

Studio albums

Compilation albums

Live albums

Singles

As lead artist

As featured artist

Videography

Video albums

Music videos

Other appearances

References

External links 
 Official Website
 Mary Chapin Carpenter discography at Discogs

Country music discographies
Folk music discographies
Discographies of American artists